Hugo Ruíz Martín del Campo (born January 10, 1977 in San Luis Potosí, San Luis Potosí, Mexico) is a retired Mexican footballer who last played for Lobos de la BUAP in the Liga de Ascenso.

Career
In 2002, he began his career with club Atlante. He debuted against America in a 2-0 loss. He has played in clubs like Atlante, San Luis and Club Tijuana.

External links

1977 births
Living people
Mexican footballers
Atlante F.C. footballers
San Luis F.C. players
Club Puebla players
Club Tijuana footballers
Lobos BUAP footballers
Liga MX players
People from San Luis Potosí City
Association football midfielders